Rumor Has It may refer to:

Film and television 
 Rumor Has It (film), a 2005 romantic comedy film
 Rumor Has It (game show), a 1993 game show on VH1
 Rumour Has It , a 2016 series by Ndani TV

Music 
 "Rumour Has It" (Donna Summer song), 1978
 Rumor Has It (Reba McEntire album), 1990
 "Rumor Has It" (Reba McEntire song), a single from the album
 Rumor Has It (Clay Walker album), 1997
 "Rumor Has It" (Clay Walker song), a single from the album
 Rumor Has It: Astaroth Has Stolen Your Eyes, a 2006 album by Catherine
 Rumor Has It, a fictional talk show featured in the 2008 music video "La La Land" by Demi Lovato
 "Rumour Has It" (Adele song), 2011

Other uses 
 "Rumor Has It", the tagline for the website Snopes.com